Eran Creevy is a British director most famous for his films Shifty (2008) and Welcome to the Punch (2013), and several music videos.

Career
After assisting Matthew Vaughn and Woody Allen on the films Layer Cake and Scoop respectively, he began directing music videos for artists such as Asher D and Sway. It wasn't long before he directed his first commercial for Coca-Cola's energy drink, Relentless. Since then he has continued to direct music videos including "Destination Calabria" for Alex Gaudino, which went on to be one of the top 5 music videos in 2007. His Utah Saints promo won best dance promo at the UK Music Awards in 2008. His video for Sonny J, "Hands Free", also picked up several award nominations.  His commercial credit list has grown to include further work for Relentless, Carlsberg, the Nike Plus campaign for W&K Amsterdam, the US Coastguard and commercials for the hit US television show The Chase. He wrote and directed his debut feature Shifty which was released nationwide in cinemas in 2009. Shifty was nominated for a BAFTA, 5 BIFAs and named as one of Empire magazine's best films of the year. His next feature film, action thriller Welcome to the Punch, went into production in 2011 and was executive produced by Ridley Scott.

Filmography

Films
Feature films
 Shifty (2008)
 Welcome to the Punch (2013)
 Collide (2016)

Other credits
 Layer Cake
 Scoop
 Breaking and Entering
 Millions
 Life and Lyrics
 Breakfast on Pluto
 Wimbledon

Television

Music videos
 Alex Gaudino – "Destination Calabria"
 Armand Van Helden & A-Track present Duck Sauce – "Anyway"
 Eric Prydz - "Pjanoo"
 Asher D – "This Is Real"
 Natty – "Coldtown"
 Passenger – "Wicked Man's Rest"
 Riz MC, Sway & Plan B – "Shifty"
 Ronan Keating – "All Over Again"
 Sonny J – "Handsfree"
 Take That – "Kidz"
 Tim Deluxe – "Let the Beats Roll"
 Utah Saints – "Something Good '08"

Commercials
 Relentless
 Nike Sofia
 Nike Not A Runner
 US Coastguard Born Ready
 Sci Fi The Chase
 Carlsberg

Awards and nominations
BAFTA Awards
 Outstanding Debut by a British Writer, Director or Producer - Shifty

British Independent Film Award (2008)
 Best Achievement in Production - Shifty
 Douglas Hickox Award (Eran Creevy)

Stockholm Film Festival (2009)
 Bronze Horse (Eran Creevy)

UK Music Video Awards
 "Something Good '08" (Best Dance Video - UK Music Video Awards 2008)
 "Handsfree"	(Nominated for 3 UK Music Video Awards 2008)

References

External links
 

English film directors
English screenwriters
English male screenwriters
Living people
Year of birth missing (living people)